Resende Futebol Clube, commonly known as Resende, is a Brazilian professional football club in Resende, Rio de Janeiro. The team compete in Campeonato Carioca, the top tier of the Rio de Janeiro state football league.

History
On 6 June 1909, the club was founded.

In 2007, Resende beat Mesquita 1–0, thus winning the Campeonato Carioca Second Level, and being promoted to the following year's Campeonato Carioca. On 20 January 2008, the club played its first Campeonato Carioca match, against Botafogo. Botafogo beat Resende 2–0. In 2009, the club finished as Taça Guanabara's runners-up, after being defeated 3–0 by Botafogo.

Stadium

Resende's home stadium is Municipal do Trabalhador, inaugurated on 1 October 1992, with a maximum capacity of 7,400 people.

Current squad

Achievements
 Campeonato Carioca Segunda Divisão:
 Winners (1): 2007
 Taça Guanabara:
 Runners-up (1): 2009
Copa Rio:
 Winners (2): 2014, 2015

References

External links
 Official Site 

Association football clubs established in 1909
 
Football clubs in Rio de Janeiro (state)
1909 establishments in Brazil